The Albania national football team represents Albania in men's international football, and is governed by the Albanian Football Association, the governing body for football in Albania.

Albania competes in the three major international football tournaments; the FIFA World Cup, UEFA European Championship and UEFA Nations League. Albania was the winner of the 1946 Balkan Cup and the 2000 Malta Rothmans International Tournament. At Euro 2016, Albania made its first debut at a major men's football tournament.

Albania scored their first ever goal in a major tournament and secured their first ever win in a European Championship, when they beat Romania on 19 June 2016.

Since its completion in 2019, Arena Kombëtare (National Arena), known as Air Albania Stadium for sponsorship reasons, has been the team's home ground. Albania's highest FIFA World Ranking was 22nd in August 2015.

The colours of the team are red, white and black, and the double headed eagle its symbol. Its supporters are collectively known as the Tifozët Kuq e Zi and display as well as the country's national flag colours, red and black.

In 2020, Albania won for the first time a group by finishing first in group 4 of UEFA Nations League C and has been promoted in UEFA Nations League B.

History

20th century

Although it never played any matches, the Albania national football team existed before the Albanian Football Association (Federata Shqiptare e Futbollit; FSHF) was created on 6 June 1930. Albania joined FIFA during a congress held between 12 and 16 June. Albania played its first international match against Yugoslavia in 1946, which ended in a 3–2 home defeat at Qemal Stafa Stadium. In 1946, Albania also participated for the first time in the Balkan Cup in which Albania won by beating Romania 1–0 in the final. In 1954, Albania was one of the founding members of UEFA. Albania waited until 1962 to compete in a Euro Cup competition and the only time Albania was between the best 16 teams of the Continent, the reason being Albania got past the first leg as Greece, for political reasons forfeited the game. At the end of the tournament Albania ranked 9th in Europe. Albania participated at the 1964 Summer Olympics in the Men's qualification tournament, and closely lost both matches against Bulgaria in the preliminary round. They would participate for the second and last time at the 1972 Summer Olympics in which they faced Romania at the Men's European Qualifiers in the Playoffs. Albania would lose both matches close with 2–1 in the first leg and 1–2 at home in the second leg.

Albania participated for the first time in a qualifying phrase of a World Cup in the qualifiers of the 1966 edition in England. The team was drawn in the Group 5 which finished in the last position with only one point from six matches. In the qualifiers, of the UEFA Euro 1968 Albania had a draw 0–0 against West Germany that denied the Germans the participation to the UEFA Euro 1968 finals. In later years, Albania did not participate in the qualifiers of the World Cup 1970, UEFA Euro 1976, World Cup 1978 and UEFA Euro 1980 for unknown political reasons. After six years without playing any international matches, Albania entered in the qualifiers of the World Cup 1982, managing to finish in a place other than last for the first time in a qualifying match, with Finland getting last place instead. In the following qualification for the World Cup 1986 Albania were able to beat famously Belgium at home in Tirana with 2–0 as well as drawing away in Mielec against Poland with 2–2 despite leading until the end of this match. Their last point were won against Greece at home. Missing out close for their first ever FIFA World Cup as they finished third in the standings. The qualifiers of the World Cup 1990 were probably the worst qualifier in Albania's history as there were 6 losses in as many games with no memorable matches.

21st century
In the qualifiers of the World Cup 2002, Albania recorded a 2–0 win over Greece which was the only team that they beat during the qualifiers. Albania was able to make some impact in the qualifying of the UEFA Euro 2004 by beating 3–1 Russia at Loro Boriçi Stadium. This match was also the debut of the German coach Hans-Peter Briegel who led Albania to an undefeated run at home matches. Despite the good results, Albania finished the group in the penultimate spot with only eight points. In the qualifiers of the World Cup 2006 Albania recorded some historical results. Two months after Greece beat Portugal to win the European Championship, Albania defeated Greece 2–1.

In the qualifiers of the UEFA Euro 2008 Albania won twice in both matches against Luxembourg. Albania also drew 2–2 with Belarus and 0–0 away with Bulgaria. Albania's Euro campaign ended with a 6–1 loss away to Romania which resulted in the resignation of the coach Otto Barić and his assistant. In December 2007, Arie Haan was named Albania's head coach by signing a two-year contract for the qualifiers of the World Cup 2010, where Albania made a very negative performance by winning only one match. Albania won only seven points from ten matches and Haan was replaced by Josip Kuže in May 2009 following the end of the campaign. However, Kuže couldn't lead Albania to the better results as the team ended the qualifiers of the UEFA Euro 2012 with only nine points from ten matches. With Kuže in charge, Albania recorded its second biggest win the history by defeating Cyprus 6–1 at home, equal with Albania's 5–0 victory over Vietnam in 2003.

Josip Kuže parted ways with Albania three and a half years after he started the job, and in December 2011, Italian coach Gianni de Biasi replaced him. Albania started the qualifiers and was, at one point, 2nd in group with six matches played and four to spare, but failed to be successful in the last four, losing away in Slovenia and Iceland, as well as at home against Switzerland, and drawing in Cyprus. Albania started the qualifiers of the UEFA Euro 2016 with an emphatic 1–0 away win against Portugal, which was followed by a 1–1 draw against Denmark at the newly renovated stadium Elbasan Arena. After beating Armenia 3–0 in the last qualifying match, Albania made history by qualifying for the UEFA Euro 2016, its first appearance at a major men's football tournament after 50 years. In the tournament itself, Albania lost 0–1 to Switzerland and 0–2 to hosts France. While they beat Romania 1–0 (their first win against Romania since 1947), the team finished last among the third-placed teams and didn't progress beyond the group stage.

Following the almost successful UEFA European Championship's, Albania suffered massive setback. In 2018 World Cup qualification, Albania failed to qualify and finished in 3rd, which was, however, their best result in history. During this era, their successful manager, Gianni De Biasi, resigned and Christian Panucci, another Italian, replaced him as coach of Albania. However, things were little improved. Albania played poorly in the 2018–19 UEFA Nations League, winning only to Israel 1–0 and lost the remaining three, especially the devastating 0–4 defeat to Scotland at home. Panucci would be sacked after a 0–2 defeat to Turkey in the opening campaign for the UEFA Euro 2020 qualifying. Another Italian, Edoardo Reja, was appointed to help Albania to improve in a tough group, but improvement is still very little. Albania failed to qualify to UEFA Euro 2020, archiving just a disappointing 4th place.

Team image

Nicknames
The Albania national football team has been known or nicknamed as the "Kuq e Zinjtë" ("The Red and Blacks") and "Shqiponjat" ("The Eagles"). In addition to the official nickname, the Albania national team had another nickname as:
"Kosova B" ("Kosovo B") — During the period before 2016, the national teams of Albania and Kosovo have exchanged players with each other, which influenced these two teams to be nicknamed reserve (B) teams of each other, the Albania national team which was nicknamed Kosovo B due to of the large number of players of Kosovo Albanian descent in its composition, but the same thing happened with the Kosovo national team was nicknamed Albania B due to many players came to play for Kosovo as they had no space to play for Albania.

Kits

Albania' colours are red and black, mirroring the nation's flag. The team typically wears red shirts, black shorts and red socks. Away kits are usually all-white, with red and black trim. In the 2000s, Albania signed with German sportswear company Puma and was the first kit supplier of Albania in the 21st century. On 29 January 2016, Albania signed Italian sportswear company Macron, which continues to be Albania's kit.

Kit sponsorship

Home stadium

Albania's main stadium for most part of the history was Qemal Stafa Stadium located in Tirana. The work started in April 1939 during the Italy regime. The construction lasted for three years but it stopped briefly in August 1943 following the fall of fascist regime. The stadium had an Olympic Stadium shape, as idealized by Gherardo Bosio, a young fascist architect from Florence, Italy. The stadium's initial capacity was 15,000, this due to the fact that Tirana at that time had only 60,000 inhabitants. It was named after Qemal Stafa, a Hero of Albania in World War II. The stadium was inaugurated officially on 7 October 1946 when Albania played its first competitive match against Yugoslavia. Ever since then, further 130 international matches took place in the stadium, with the last being a friendly against Georgia in November 2015. In 2005, Cecilia de Marco and Elisabetta Lorusso, two young Italian students, called the stadium as "one of the strongest symbols of Italian impact in Albania". In November 2013, Qemal Stafa Stadium was shut down by FIFA for not fulfilling international standards. The stadium's demolition started in June 2016, and it was announced that is going to be replaced by Arena Kombëtare.

Albania sometimes has played home matches at other venues. Outside Tirana, the national team has played matches in Flamurtari Stadium in Vlorë, Tomori Stadium in Berat, Niko Dovana Stadium in Durrës, Loro Boriçi Stadium in Shkodër and Elbasan Arena in Elbasan. In February 2014, due to Albania not having a stadium that fulfills international standards set by FIFA, the work for renovation of Elbasan Arena (at the time Ruzhdi Bizhuta Stadium) started. The work lasted for 7 months, and the stadium was inaugurated on 9 October when Albania played a friendly match against KF Elbasani under-19 squad; Albania won the match 17–0. The official inauguration occurred two days later in the UEFA Euro 2016 qualifying match against Denmark.

The first international match at Loro Boriçi Stadium was played on 29 March 2003 against Russia, with Albania winning 3–1. In October 2014, Prime Minister of Albania, Edi Rama, promised the reconstruction of the stadium. The stadium's construction started in May 2015 and finished in August 2016. In 2016–17, the stadium served temporary as the home of Kosovo national team, due to stadiums in Mitrovica and Pristina were under renovation and did not meet UEFA standards.

Rivalries

Kosovo

This derby is otherwise known as Brotherly derby, also known as the Brotherly. The documented beginnings of this derby date back to the time during the World War II, respectively on 29 November 1942, where they played a friendly match as part of the celebrations for 30th Anniversary of the Independence of Albania and the match ended with a 2–0 win for Tirana, this derby is back 50 years after the first match, when the Football Federation of Kosovo signed a cooperation protocol with the Albanian Football Association and in the framework of this protocol it was decided to play on 14 February a friendly match between these two national teams, and this match ended with a 3–1 win for Albania.

Serbia

This football rivalry between Albania and Serbia is mainly due to historical tensions between the two countries. It has been described as "one of the fiercest rivalries in the world". During the Euro 2016 qualifying phase, the Serbian crowd were chanting "Kill, kill Albanians" and were throwing flares at the Albania team, after which there was a clash between the Serbia and Albania teams.

Supporters

Tifozat Kuq e Zi (Red and Black Fans, also known as the Albania National Football Team Supporters Club) is a non-profit football supporters' association for the Albania national football team and various national team sportive activities. It was founded on 25 December 2003. In cooperation with FSHF, it organises trips for football fans to visit games, and develops and sells merchandise to support itself and fund sporting related projects.

Tifozat Kuq e Zi stands firm in the political view that Albanians should share only one national team and have continuous aspirations to join in one state (Një Komb, Një Kombëtare), i.e. unification of Albania, Kosovo, etc. In this sense, TKZ is joined by different supporters' associations throughout Albanian-speaking regions mainly in Kosovo (Shqiponjat of Peja, Kuqezinjet e Jakoves of Gjakova, Plisat of Prishtina, Torcida of Mitrovica, etc.), North Macedonia (Ballistët of Tetovë, Ilirët of Kumanovë, Shvercerat of Shkupi, etc.) and in Albania itself (Ultras Guerrils of Partizani Tirana, Tirona Fanatics of KF Tirana, Vllaznit Ultras of Vllaznia Shkodër, Ujqërit e Deborës of Skënderbeu Korçë, Shqiponjat of KF Besa Pejë and many other different Albanian fans).

There are sports twinnings with some amateur football teams of the historic Albanian communities of Italy (Arbëreshë): in 2017, on the occasion of the Italy – Albania match played in Palermo (Sicily, Italy) for the World Cup qualifiers, the local team and the Municipality of Piana degli Albanesi welcomed the ambassador of the Republic of Albania, the official delegation of the Albanian football federation and numerous Albanian fans who also came from the Balkans, in a fraternal and sporting twinning Arbëreshë-Shqiptarë.

The ongoing dispute between the Ministry of Culture, Youth and Sports and the Football Association of Albania has been seen as a political intrusion by FIFA and UEFA, which led to the banning of Albania from international sportive activities. FSHF president Armand Duka is highly unwanted by the TKZ who have numerously asked for his resignation believing he is responsible for internal corruption in the Albanian Football Association.

The TKZ have been praised by many different football players and managers, whom were not just Albanian. One example is with Switzerland's former coach, Ottmar Hitzfeld, who was astonished by how many Albanian fans turned up and how enthusiastic they were in 2014 FIFA World Cup qualifying match between Switzerland and Albania where the Swiss won 2–0 thanks to goals from Gökhan Inler and Kosovo-born Xherdan Shaqiri. He didn't believe that there was 12,000 Albanian fans in the stands which was more than how many Swiss fans turned up for the game. He stated that "Albanian fans are fantastic and the most passionate fans I have ever seen". During that campaign, TKZ attended all games Albania played apart from a match against Cyprus in Nicosia and were also large in numbers in the away games to Slovenia in Maribor and Norway in Oslo.

Media coverage

Current

Previous

Results and fixtures

2022

2023

Coaching staff

Current coaching staff

Players

Current squad
The following players were called up for the UEFA Euro 2024 qualifying match against Poland, on 27 March 2023.
Caps and goals are correct as of 19 November 2022 after the match against Armenia.

Recent call-ups
The following players have been called up for the team within the last 12 months and are still available for selection.

Notes
U21 = Was called up from national U21 squad.
INJ = It is not part of the current squad due to injury.

Records

.
Players in bold are still active with Albania.

Most appearances

Top goalscorers

Competitive record

FIFA World Cup

UEFA European Championship

UEFA Nations League

By competitions

Other tournaments

Mediterranean Games

FIFA rankings
As of 26 July 2020
Source:

 Best Ranking   Worst Ranking   Best Mover   Worst Mover

Honours

 Balkan Cup:
 Champions (1): 1946
 Malta International Football Tournament:
 Champions (1): 2000
 UEFA Nations League 
 Promotion (1): 2020–21 UEFA Nations League C

Head-to-head record
 after match against Armenia

Notes

See also
 Albanian Football Association
 Football in Albania
 Albania national youth football team
 Albania national under-23 football team 
 Albania national under-21 football team
 Albania national under-20 football team
 Albania national under-19 football team
 Albania national under-18 football team
 Albania national under-17 football team
 Albania national under-16 football team
 Albania national under-15 football team

Notes and references

Notes

References

External links

 Official website 
 Albania at UEFA site
 Albania at FIFA site
 Tifozat Kuq e Zi / Red and Black Fan Club
 RSSSF – Albania national football team international matches 
 Stadia in Albania 

1946 establishments in Albania
 
Football in Albania
European national association football teams